The Forrest Cemetery Chapel and Comfort Station (also known as the Ruth Cross Memorial Chapel) are historic structures in Gadsden, Alabama.  The chapel, comfort station, and cemetery gates were built in 1935 by workers from the Works Progress Administration, and designed by local architect Paul W. Hofferbert, who also designed the Legion Park Bowl.  The chapel is designed in Gothic Revival style, with a steeply pitched gable with three lancet arched windows and a square tower with lancet arch opening for the entrance.  The front gate columns and wall are connected to a hipped roof comfort building, which originally housed restrooms, but is now used for storage.  All three are constructed of rough-cut sandstone blocks quarried from nearby Lookout Mountain.  The buildings were listed on the Alabama Register of Landmarks and Heritage in 1988 and the National Register of Historic Places in 1992.

References

National Register of Historic Places in Etowah County, Alabama
Properties of religious function on the National Register of Historic Places in Alabama
Gothic Revival church buildings in Alabama
Churches completed in 1935
Buildings and structures in Gadsden, Alabama
Works Progress Administration in Alabama
Historic districts in Etowah County, Alabama
Historic districts on the National Register of Historic Places in Alabama
1935 establishments in Alabama